The Symphony of Science is a music project created by Washington-based electronic musician John D. Boswell. The project seeks to "spread scientific knowledge and philosophy through musical remixes."  Boswell uses pitch-corrected audio and video samples from television programs featuring popular educators and scientists. The audio and video clips are mixed into digital mashups and scored with Boswell's original compositions. Two of Boswell's music videos, "A Glorious Dawn" and "We are All Connected", feature appearances from Carl Sagan, Richard Feynman, Neil deGrasse Tyson, Bill Nye, and Stephen Hawking. The audio and video is sampled from popular science television shows including Cosmos, The Universe, The Eyes of Nye, The Elegant Universe, and Stephen Hawking's Universe.

Unruly Media, a video tracking service, first charted "A Glorious Dawn" on September 21, 2009. A month later, the video had received more than a million views and was ranked in the music category on YouTube as one of the top rated videos of all time.  On November 9, 2009, Third Man Records released a 7-inch single of "A Glorious Dawn" for the 75th anniversary of the birth of Carl Sagan. According to Discogs.com, there were a total of 5 different vinyl records produced, including a limited edition 8-inch single given out only at South by Southwest 2010.

John D. Boswell
Composer John Boswell had been experimenting with sampling and remixing for some time before creating his first YouTube videos. Boswell had worked with Auto-Tune in the past and thought people might be interested in hearing American astronomer Carl Sagan sing. He first saw Cosmos in 2004 and soon after bought the set of DVDs. Boswell looked through these episodes for "profound quotes" that lacked music in the background.  Once he found these quotes, Boswell Auto-Tuned Sagan's voice and picked from the best ones.  After completing what became "A Glorious Dawn", Boswell posted the video on YouTube in September 2009 and to his surprise, the video went viral within a week.  To date, the video has received nearly ten million views and is ranked as one of the top rated videos of all time in the music category.

Born in Idaho, John Boswell attended Gonzaga Preparatory School and graduated from Western Washington University in 2008 with a degree in economics. Soon after, Boswell started Colorpulse, an electronica music project, and began to focus on production. He released an album in 2010, titled Escaping the Tangle, which included some of these productions. Boswell lives in Seattle.  His music project Symphony of Science "aims to spread scientific knowledge and philosophy through musical remixes" and to "deliver scientific knowledge and philosophy in musical form". After his first few videos, Boswell began seeking permission to use the clips he uses in his project. In addition to Symphony of Science, Boswell is also working on a project called Remixes for the Soul, as well as scientific-based films, most notably Timelapse of the Future, under the moniker Melodysheep.

Music and video

A Glorious Dawn

Boswell's first video in the Symphony of Science series is 3 minutes, 34 seconds long and features Carl Sagan and Stephen Hawking. Samples include clips from Cosmos (1980) and Stephen Hawking's Universe (1997).  On September 21, 2009, Unruly Media, a viral video tracking service, began to chart the popularity of the video.  At the end of the first week of October, the video had received 800,000 views and, by the end of the month, more than a million. By the end of 2010, the video had surpassed 5 million views.

The title takes its name from the chorus spoken by Carl Sagan, remixed from an episode of Cosmos.

Third Man Records released a 7-inch recording of "A Glorious Dawn" on November 9, 2009, in honor of the 75th anniversary of the birth of Carl Sagan.  The one-sided single was created by United Record Pressing in a unique "Cosmos Colored Vinyl", limited pressing of 150 copies; it was then re-pressed on regular vinyl in a larger run.  The flipside is etched with a copy of the diagram found on the Voyager Golden Record.

"A Glorious Dawn" is the first ever record to be played in space.

We Are All Connected

The second video in the series is 4 minutes, 12 seconds in length and features Carl Sagan, Richard Feynman, Neil deGrasse Tyson, and Bill Nye. It was released on October 19, 2009. Audio and video samples are taken from The History Channel's Universe series, Carl Sagan's Cosmos, interviews with Richard Feynman in 1983, Neil deGrasse Tyson's cosmic sermon, and Bill Nye's The Eyes of Nye series. Additional visuals come from NOVA's The Elegant Universe, Stephen Hawking's Universe, and Cosmos, among others. On January 23, 2010, the video was shown at the South Nassau Unitarian Universalist Church in Long Island NY, as part of a youth-directed service. The video has been used in other churches and classrooms.

The title comes from the chorus spoken by Neil deGrasse Tyson and remixed by Boswell:

Our Place in the Cosmos

The third video in the series is 4 minutes, 21 seconds in length and was released on November 23, 2009.  "Our Place in the Cosmos" features Carl Sagan, Richard Dawkins, Michio Kaku, and Robert Jastrow.  Samples were taken from Cosmos, Genius of Charles Darwin, a TED talk, Stephen Hawking's Universe, interviews and visuals from Baraka and Koyaanisqatsi, History Channel's Universe series, and Cosmic Voyage.

The title comes from words spoken by Carl Sagan and remixed by Boswell:

The Unbroken Thread

The fourth video in the series is 4 minutes in length and was released on January 6, 2010. "The Unbroken Thread" is themed around biology and evolution rather than the cosmos, and features Carl Sagan, David Attenborough, and Jane Goodall.

The video uses clips from Cosmos, several David Attenborough documentaries (Charles Darwin and the Tree of Life, The Life of Mammals, The Living Planet, and BBC Life), XVIVO Scientific Animations, IMAX Cosmic Voyage, Jane Goodall's TED Talk, and a Guinness commercial.

The title comes from Sagan's Cosmos.

The Poetry of Reality (An Anthem for Science)
The fifth installment uses clips from various prominent scientists and speakers - including Jacob Bronowski, Sagan, Feynman, Dawkins, Brian Greene, Stephen Hawking, PZ Myers, Lawrence Krauss, Michael Shermer, and deGrasse Tyson - to explain and promote science, its process, and its benefits. The video was released on February 25, 2010. It uses clips from many sources, including Cosmos and The Genius of Charles Darwin.
The chorus in this piece is sung by Dawkins and Sagan.

The Case for Mars
The sixth installment is about the colonization of Mars. It features Sagan, Robert Zubrin, Brian Cox, and Penelope Boston, and it features clips from The Mars Underground (2007), Cosmos: A Personal Voyage, and Wonders of the Solar System. The video was released on June 3, 2010. The title of this song stems from Zubrin's book The Case For Mars. The chorus is sung by Sagan and Cox.
Incidentally, The Case for Mars (Instrumental) is also used as the theme tune for the British short film/ pilot, The Black Room.

A Wave of Reason

The seventh installment, released on November 23, 2010, is about reasoning and skepticism. It features Carl Sagan, Bertrand Russell, Sam Harris, Michael Shermer, Lawrence Krauss, Carolyn Porco, Richard Dawkins, Richard Feynman, Phil Plait, and James Randi. It is intended to promote scientific reasoning and skepticism in the face of growing amounts of pseudoscientific pursuits, such as Astrology and Homeopathy, and also to "promote the scientific worldview as equally enlightening as religion." The chorus is sung by Dawkins, except for the last line which is Phil Plait's:

The Big Beginning

"The Big Beginning" is the eighth installment in the Symphony of Science music video series, released on January 20, 2011. It deals with the origins of our universe, covering the Big Bang theory, expansion and cooling of the universe, formation of galaxies, the interplay between matter and anti-matter, and cosmic radiation. The music video features Stephen Hawking, Richard Dawkins, Carl Sagan, Tara Shears, and Neil deGrasse Tyson. Videos sampled for this installment include Into the Universe with Stephen Hawking; God, the Universe, and Everything Else; The Universe on The History Channel; NOVA scienceNOW; interviews with Richard Dawkins and Tara Shears; and Carl Sagan's Cosmos. There is no clear chorus, but two quotes from Hawking and Dawkins come back several times.

Ode to the Brain

"Ode to the Brain" is the ninth episode in the Symphony of Science series about the brain including its evolution, folding, and neuron networks. It features Carl Sagan, Robert Winston, Vilayanur Ramachandran, Jill Bolte Taylor, Bill Nye and Oliver Sacks. It features clips from Carl Sagan's Cosmos, BBC's The Human Body, Discovery Channel's Human Body: Pushing the Limits and various TED Talks. It was released on March 23, 2011.
The chorus is sung by Taylor:

Children of Africa (The Story of Us)

"Children of Africa" is the tenth installment of the Symphony of Science series, released on July 6, 2011. It deals with the cultural evolution of humans from their origins in Africa, through the conquest of Europe from the Neanderthals to the space age. It features Alice Roberts, Jacob Bronowski, Carolyn Porco, Jane Goodall, Robert Sapolsky, Neil deGrasse Tyson and David Attenborough. Programs sampled for this installment include Jacob Bronowski's The Ascent of Man, Alice Roberts' The Incredible Human Journey, along with BBC documentaries Life of Mammals, Walking With Cavemen, and Human Planet. The refrain is from the speech, Science In Hollywood, by Carolyn Porco.

The Quantum World

"The Quantum World" is the eleventh installment of the Symphony of Science series, released on September 6, 2011. It deals with the bizarre discoveries made in the field of quantum mechanics, through "a musical investigation into the nature of atoms and subatomic particles." It features Morgan Freeman, Stephen Hawking, Michio Kaku, Brian Cox, Richard Feynman, and Frank Close. Programs sampled for this instalment include Richard Feynman's Fun to Imagine, Morgan Freeman's Through the Wormhole, Brian Cox's TED Talk, along with BBC documentaries  Visions of the Future, What Time is it, Wonders of the Universe, and What Is Reality. The refrain is sung by Cox.

Onward to the Edge
"Onward to the Edge," "a musical investigation into the importance and inspirational qualities of space exploration (human and robotic), as well as a look at some of the amazing worlds in our solar system," is the twelfth installment of the Symphony of Science series, released on November 9, 2011. It features Neil deGrasse Tyson, Brian Cox, and Carolyn Porco. Programs sampled for this installment include Wonders of the Solar System, My Favorite Universe, A Traveler's Guide to the Planets, and Carolyn Porco's TED Talk. The refrain is sung by Tyson.

The Greatest Show on Earth
"The Greatest Show on Earth," the thirteenth installment of the Symphony of Science series, released on January 17, 2012, is a "musical celebration of the wonders of biology, including evolution, natural selection, DNA, and more." It features David Attenborough, Bill Nye, and Richard Dawkins. Programs sampled include Life, Planet Earth, David Attenborough's First Life, Charles Darwin and the Tree of Life, Bill Nye the Science Guy'''s episode on evolution, and Dawkins' "There is grandeur in this view of life" speech. The refrain is sung by Dawkins:

The World of the Dinosaurs
"The World of the Dinosaurs," released on March 20, 2012, is the fourteenth installment of the Symphony of Science series. It is a "musical celebration of dinosaurs" and investigates their habits, extinction, and how we learn about them. It features Alice Roberts, Bill Nye, Nigel Marven, Dallas Campbell and more.  The refrain is sung by Roberts and Campbell:

We are Star Dust
"We are Star Dust," released on May 9, 2012, is the fifteenth installment of the series. It features Neil deGrasse Tyson, Richard Feynman, and Lawrence Krauss. The song explains the origins of the elements that make up our bodies, in stars and supernovae. The refrain is sung by Tyson.

Our Biggest Challenge (Climate Change Music Video)
The sixteenth installment, released September 12, 2012, is titled "Our Biggest Challenge (Climate Change Music Video)". It features Bill Nye, David Attenborough, Richard Alley and Isaac Asimov. The song speaks the stark realities of climate change, however the message is that if we can come together, we can overcome this challenge. The refrain is sung mostly by Richard Alley while the last three lines are sung by Isaac Asimov:

The Secret of the Stars
On February 26, 2013, Boswell released the seventeenth installment, "The Secret of the Stars," which explores the beauty of Einstein's concept of relativity, its applications to time, speed, energy and mass, and its effects on the movement and light of stars. The music video features Michio Kaku, Neil deGrasse Tyson, Brian Greene, Lisa Randall, and Brian Cox. Michio Kaku performs the chorus with Brian Cox, who sings only the first and fourth lines:

 Monsters of the Cosmos 
On August 27, 2013, Boswell released the eighteenth installment, "Monsters of the Cosmos", which explains the black hole phenomenon and how they are both terrible and beautiful, destroying stars but creating galaxies. The music video features Morgan Freeman, Neil deGrasse Tyson, Michio Kaku, and Lawrence Krauss. Morgan Freeman performs the chorus with Lawrence Krauss:

Waves of Light
On July 28, 2015 the nineteenth installment of Symphony of Science, titled "Waves of Light," was released. The video explains the way that we are able to look at the history of the universe through the power of light. The music is sung by Brian Cox.

Beyond the Horizon
On October 24, 2015, the twentieth installment of Symphony of Science, titled "Beyond the Horizon", was released.

It was created in collaboration with the Planetary Society, and is sung by Bill Nye, Neil DeGrasse Tyson, Emily Lakdawalla, and Carl Sagan.

The Nature of Sound
Released on November 1, 2017, the twenty-first entry is titled "The Nature of Sound" and is about how sound is generated via vibration but also about how music interacts with the human psyche. The chorus is sung by Bill Nye.

Children of Planet Earth: The Voyager Golden Record Remixed
Released on December 10, 2018, the twenty-second installment of Symphony of Science is titled "Children of Planet Earth: The Voyager Golden Record Remixed".

This installment focuses on the Voyager Golden Record, two gold-plated records launched with the Voyager 1 and Voyager 2 space probes. The chorus is the English greeting on the record: "Hello from the children of planet Earth." The music video ends with a Morse code message spelling out Per aspera ad astra, meaning "Through hardships to the stars."

Related projects
Symphony of Bang Goes The Theory
Not strictly part of the Symphony of Science series as this was made for the BBC science show Bang Goes the Theory, it nevertheless uses the same formula of pitch correction of spoken words over an original music track. It celebrates the tantalising questions that science throws up, as well as being an entertaining showreel for the show itself. In addition to the four presenters - Liz Bonnin, Dallas Campbell, Jem Stansfield, and Yan Wong -  there are guest spots for Jim Al-Khalili and Tara Shears. The clips are all taken from the TV show or its website.

The chorus is sung by Yan Wong.

PBS Digital Studios
While not strictly part of the Symphony of Science series, Boswell uses the same formula of pitch correction of spoken words over an original music track.  Made for the Public Broadcasting Service's PBS Digital Studios, various clips from present and past PBS programming are sampled to make these songs.

 Carl Sagan Tribute Series by Milky Way Musings 
Similarly, another science inspired music project came about during the period in which Symphony of Science had gone viral. The Carl Sagan Tribute Series featured snippets of the COSMOS television series episodes and Carl Sagan overlaid with select music recordings. According to the creator, Callum C. J. Sutherland of Toronto, Canada,

"Milky Way Musings is a non-profit organization dedicated to promoting scientific literacy, supporting funding for scientific research and providing creative and educational science programming that is accessible to everyone".

 The Sagan and Feynman Series by Reid Gower 
Founded by Reid Gower of Victoria, British Columbia, Canada, The Sagan Series and The Feynman Series were also a byproduct of the same era spawned by Boswell's Symphony of Science. Although neither of them collaborated, both music video projects had similar themes, incorporating popularizers of science and science education set to musical melodies and inspirational themes.

Reviews
Musician Carrie Brownstein found the idea behind Symphony of Science "quite beautiful and amazing in both its sincerity and aims". She also enjoyed the "hip-hop stylings" of the camera angle on Bill Nye while he is moving his hands around and expressing himself on "We Are All Connected". Writer Nick Sagan, son of Carl Sagan, was impressed with "A Glorious Dawn", giving it a favorable review and stamp of approval. Sagan writes, "John Boswell over at Colorpulse Music is a mad genius, sampling both Cosmos and Stephen Hawking's Universe series into three minutes and thirty-four seconds of pure, concentrated awesomeness... Love it, love it, love it. Dad would have loved it, too."

Columnist Franklin Harris argues that Boswell's videos show that science can arouse the minds of artists just as much as religion and mythology have in the past. Harris calls the videos "art for the Information Age, inspired by science".New Music Transmission, a podcast who featured Symphony of Science in 2009, gave "A Glorious Dawn" positive reviews and called Symphony of Science as "A thinking man's Pogo", referring to the Australian electro artist who was featured 2 weeks before.

Christopher Jion, of Dirgefunk Records'', has praised Symphony of Science saying, "When I first heard John Boswell's "A Glorious Dawn," it brought tears to my eyes, it was life-changing. The original idea was to release a compilation of space and science-themed tracks from a handful of artists I like (of course, including some Symphony Of Science tracks). But as John kept releasing new Symphony Of Science material it became very obvious that it deserved its own album, and, as it's an ongoing project, perhaps there will be more volumes to follow. This CD is a gift from me to anyone listening who has a passion for music and science. It was paid for out of my own pocket with nothing expected in return. It's free to anyone who'll appreciate its ideas and messages. Dirgefunk Records does not exist for profit Its sole existence is to release material for the enjoyment of myself and likeminded persons. So, enjoy. (April, 2012)"Jion released a limited edition music CD compilation in 2012 featuring 15 Symphony of Science tracks, listed below:

 A Glorious Dawn 3:33
 We Are All Connected 4:12
 Our Place In The Cosmos 4:20
 The Unbroken Thread 3:59
 The Poetry Of Reality 3:05
 The Case For Mars 4:03
 A Wave Of Reason 3:42
 The Big Beginning 3:00
 Ode To The Brain 3:41
 Children Of Africa (The Story Of Us) 4:00
 The Quantum World 3:30
 Onward To The Edge 3:37
 The Greatest Show On Earth 3:23
 The World Of The Dinosaurs 3:10
 The Cosmic Dance (Mindwalk Remix) 3:08

See also
Educational music
Musical collage

References

Further reading

External links
 Symphony of Science
 John D. Boswell on IMDb
 Melodysheep
 Music Videos - "Symphony of Science"
 Symphony of Science Video Collection on Internet Archive
 A Glorious Dawn - Third Man Records - 45 RPM 7" Vinyl Record 1200DPI Scans on Internet Archive

Electronic music groups from Washington (state)
Science in art
Music videos
Songs about science
Educational technology projects